Trupti Bhoir  is a Marathi actress. She has worked in many Marathi movies and television serials. She is famous for the role of Najuka in the movie Agadbam. Trupti has always been comfortable with comedy as well as serious types of roles.

Early life and education

Studied in Yashodham High School & Junior College.

Career
Marathi actress Trupti Bhoir is not a new name to the Marathi theatre and film industry. As an actress she has already made a mark, be it on stage, television or films. Young and ambitious Trupti who hails from Mumbai, was a part of theatre before entering the mainstream cinema. Her journey began with stage followed by TV serials and films. While in college, she took part in drama competitions and also learned the classical dance. This came to her advantage, while venturing into this field.

Trupti has already won state-level awards for best acting, during her college days. Superhit Drama Sahi Re Sahi was her first break in professional Marathi theatre. Three years since then Trupti has been a part of this industry and she has done films like Ishya, Ovalte Bhauraya, Tujhya Majhya Sansarala..., and Paulkhuna, while her television serials include the famous Vadalvaat and Char Divas Sasuche.

Trupti always tries to do experiments with the characters she plays. In the movie Agadbam she played role of the overweight girl Najuka.
Touring Talkies: The film throws light on the culture of touring talkies – film screenings inside tents (tamboo), which is slowly dying. Chandi's touring talkies is one of the rare ones still surviving in Maharashtra.  She and her brother Babya (Chinmay Sant) take great pride in showing films in their tent, which has been their family business since decades.

On Rajyasabha TV she was interviewed in the show Guftgoo with Trupti Bhoir. She explained how Touring Talkies is part of Indian Culture and why we should save it. Her film Touring Talkies was shortlisted along with 290 other films in the first round of eligibility for the Best Picture category of the Academy Awards.

Filmography

As an actor

As a Film Producer
 Touring Talkies
 Hello Jai Hind
 Tujhya Majhya Sansarala Aani Kaay Hav
 Agadbam
 Majha Agadbam

Television
Char Divas Sasuche
 Vadalvaat

Drama/Theatre/Album
 Indrakshi (Sahyadri Production)
 Sahi Re Sahi

References

1981 births
Actresses in Marathi cinema
Bhoir,Trupti
Living people
Marathi actors
Marathi film producers
Indian film actresses
Actresses in Marathi television
21st-century Indian actresses
Film producers from Mumbai
Actresses from Mumbai